Sever Your Ties, also known as SYT, was a metalcore and band from San Diego, California. Their first studio album, Safety in the Sea, was released on July 8, 2008, through Solid State Records and Tooth and Nail Records. Band members included Dustin Peterson, Sean Marnul, Justin Coyle, Patrick Lemley, Michael DiDia and Philippe Gutierrez. The band had been working on a comedy album and live action tour when on June 4, 2010, they announced that they were disbanding, due to the new found friendship between singer Sean Marnul and film director, Porter Min. After disbanding, singer Sean Marnul formed the comedy duo Gravy Brothers with friend Caleb Chial of The Black Keys while working with Porter Min on the set of Iron Man 2.

Safety In The Sea

The band's debut album, Safety in the Sea, was released on Solid State Records, a division of Tooth & Nail, on July 8, 2008. The album charted at No. 49 on the Billboard Top Christian Albums chart.

Track listing
 "Voice Like A Nova" - 3:16
 "After A Storm" - 3:01
 "Hand In Hand" - 2:54
 "This Is What You Get" - 4:06
 "Captive" - 3:48
 "Drifting" - 2:57
 "Things Are Better (Left Unsaid)" - 3:00
 "To The Pacific" - 2:38
 "Here I Am" - 2:41
 "Ashamed" - 2:38
 "(Don't Fear) The Reaper" (Blue Öyster Cult Cover) - 3:33

Uses In Media
 "(Don't Fear) The Reaper" plays during the end credits of "JC's HALLOWEEN II", a 2010 film based on the Halloween movie franchise featuring the iconic serial killer Michael Myers created by two Scottish filmmakers.

References

American post-hardcore musical groups
Christian rock groups from California
Musical groups from San Diego
Musical groups established in 2005
Solid State Records artists